Leslain Baird (born 9 May 1987) is a Guyanese athlete who compete in javelin throw. He is the national record holder in the event since 23 June 2013, when he broke the previous record that Lionel Schultz has held since September 18, 1985.

Personal best

Achievements

References

External links
 

1987 births
Living people
Guyanese male athletes
Male javelin throwers
Athletes (track and field) at the 2018 Commonwealth Games
Commonwealth Games competitors for Guyana
Competitors at the 2018 South American Games
Competitors at the 2018 Central American and Caribbean Games